This Way of Life is a New Zealand documentary film about a horse breeding family living in the wild near the Ruahine Ranges, resisting the call to a more "modern" lifestyle. It was directed by Thomas Burstyn and produced by Barbara Sumner-Burstyn.

It opened theatrically in Vancouver on 3 October 2009 at the Vancouver International Film Festival; in Seattle on 11 June 2010 at the Seattle International Film Festival, and in New York City on 30 July 2010. It opened in Los Angeles on 6 August 2010 at the 14th Annual DocuWeeks.

This Way of Life made the 2011 Oscar Documentary long list.

Cast
 Peter Ottley-Karena
 Colleen Ottley-Karena
 Llewelyn Ottley-Karena
 Aurora Ottley-Karena
 Malachi Ottley-Karena
 Elias Ottley-Karena
 Corban Ottley-Karena
 Salem Ottley-Karena

References

External links
 
 Official Website
 "This way of life" – a Karena viewpoint

Films about horses
New Zealand documentary films
2009 films
2000s English-language films